Cristina Martín-Prieto Gutiérrez (born 14 March 1993) is a Spanish footballer who plays as a forward for Granadilla.

Club career
Martín-Prieto started her career at Peña Rociera. 
In January 2022, Martín-Prieto returned to Sevilla FC on a two year deal.

References

External links
 Profile at La Liga

1993 births
Living people
Women's association football forwards
Spanish women's footballers
Footballers from Seville
Sevilla FC (women) players
Sporting de Huelva players
UD Granadilla Tenerife players
Primera División (women) players